The 1949 World Table Tennis Championships mixed doubles was the 16th edition of the mixed doubles championship.  

Ferenc Sidó and Gizi Farkas defeated Bohumil Váňa and Květa Hrušková in the final by three sets to nil.

Results

See also
List of World Table Tennis Championships medalists

References

-